Stefan Stoykov (28 January 1938 – 12 April 2013) was a Bulgarian basketball player. He competed in the men's tournament at the 1960 Summer Olympics.

References

1938 births
2013 deaths
Bulgarian men's basketball players
Olympic basketball players of Bulgaria
Basketball players at the 1960 Summer Olympics
People from Lovech Province